Argyrotaenia telemacana is a species of moth of the family Tortricidae. It is found in Paraná, Brazil.

The wingspan is about 13 mm. The ground colour of the forewings is whitish, sprinkled and dotted with brown. The hindwings are white cream with a few brownish grey strigulae (fine streaks) at the apex.

References

T
Endemic fauna of Brazil
Moths of South America
Tortricidae of South America
Moths described in 2010